Son Yong-chan (born 15 April 1991) is a South Korean footballer who plays as a midfielder.

Club career

Ceres
He played in the Philippines with Ceres FC from 2014 to 2016.

Tampines Rovers
Son moved to Singapore to play for Tampines Rovers in 2017. His first official match with the Rovers a 2017 AFC Cup game against Felda United on 21 February 2017. During this match, he also scored his first goal for the club.

Ozone
In early 2018 Son joined second-tier Indian side Ozone FC.

FC Edmonton
Son joined Canadian Premier League club FC Edmonton on 13 December 2018.

Personal life
Son was born in Jinju, South Gyeongsang, South Korea.

Son has been tagged by the media as the "Smiling Assassin" in Singapore, as he has always flashed his smile whenever the customary pre-match photo is taken. He is famous for his craft but also for his bright personality and sense of humour.

In the Philippines, Son has amassed respect and support from fans. During his first match against his former team, Ceres, Son played for the Singapore side under Tampines Rovers and returned to his former home stadium in Panaad Park and Stadium. It was this time that he again caught the eye of the media through his philanthropic deeds. He raised money to help fund a child's surgery. In his free time, he is immersing and volunteering in different philanthropic activities.

Career statistics

References

External links

1991 births
Living people
Association football midfielders
South Korean footballers
People from Jinju
South Korean expatriate footballers
Expatriate footballers in the Philippines
South Korean expatriate sportspeople in the Philippines
Expatriate footballers in Singapore
South Korean expatriate sportspeople in Singapore
Expatriate footballers in India
South Korean expatriate sportspeople in India
Expatriate soccer players in Canada
South Korean expatriate sportspeople in Canada
Ceres–Negros F.C. players
Tampines Rovers FC players
Ozone FC players
FC Edmonton players
Singapore Premier League players
I-League 2nd Division players
Canadian Premier League players
Sportspeople from South Gyeongsang Province